The information regarding List of rivers in the Tarapacá Region on this page has been compiled from the data supplied by GeoNames. It includes all features named "Rio", "Canal", "Arroyo", "Estero" and those Feature Code is associated with a stream of water. This list contains 44 water streams.

Content
This list contains:
 Name of the stream, in Spanish Language
 Coordinates are latitude and longitude of the feature in ± decimal degrees, at the mouth of the stream
 Link to a map including the Geonameid (a number which uniquely identifies a Geoname feature)
 Feature Code explained in 
 Other names for the same feature, if any
 Basin countries additional to Chile, if any

List

 Rio LoaRío Loa3882821STM

  Rio Todos SantosRío Todos Santos3869706STM
  Arroyo de Veco3868555STMI
  Arroyo Sencata3871028STM
  Río GuaiguasiRío Guaiguasi3888606STMI(Quebrada Guaiguasi, Rio Guaiguasi, Río Guaiguasi)
  Río MulluriRío Mulluri3879192STMI(Arroyo de Mulluri, Estero Mulluri, Quebrada de Mulluri, Rio Mulluri, Río Mulluri)
  Río CaicoRío Caico3897428STMI(Arroyo de Caico, Quebrada Caico, Quebrada Cajco, Rio Caico, Río Caico)
  Río CubanayaRío Cubanaya3893193STMI(Arroyo de Cubanaya, Arroyo de Cubayana, Quebrada Cuanalla, Quebrada Cubanalla, Quebrada de Cubanaya, Rio Cubanalla, Río Cubanaya)
  Arroyo de Cotase3893366STMI
  Río Camarones3897158STM(Camarones Gully, Quebrada Camarones, Quebrada de Camarones, Rio Camarones, Río Camarones)
  Rio AjatamaRío Ajatama3900322STMI
  Rio MacusaRío Macusa3881062STM
  Rio CaritayaRío Caritaya3896647STMI
  Rio BlancoRío Blanco3898218STM
  Río Huinchuta3887503STMI(Arroyo Huinchula, Arroyo Huinchuta, Estero Huinchala, Rio Huenchuta, Río Huinchuta)
  Rio ChaguaneRío Chaguane3895675STMI(Manantial de Chaguane, Rio Chaguane, Río Chaguane)
  Arroyo Pasijiro3877105STMI
  Rio ChaguaRío Chagua3895684STMI
  Arroyo Chaguane3895676STMI
  Río Llanquipa3882951STMI(Arroyo de Llanguipa, Estero Llanquipa, Quebrada de Llanquipa, Rio Llanquipa, Río Llanquipa)
  Quebrada Colca3894316STM(Arroyo de Colca, Quebrada Colca, Rio Colca, Río Colca)
  Rio ArabillaRío Arabilla3899476STMI
  Rio IslugaRío Isluga3887048STMI
  Rio SitaniRío Sitani3870817STMI
  Rio CariquimaRío Cariquima3896651STMI
  Estero Puchultisa3875083STM
  Estero Montecarabe3879464STMI
  Rio GrandeRío Grande3888781STM
  Río QuenuvutaRío Queñuvuta3874369STMI(Arroyo de Quenuvuta, Arroyo de Queñuvuta, Quebrada Challavilque, Rio Queñuvuta, Río Queñuvuta, Río Chacavilque)
  Río TanaRío Tana3870176STMI(Quebrada de Camina, Quebrada de Camiña, Quebrada de Tana, Rio Camiña, Río Camiña, Rio Tana, Río Tana)
  Arroyo Toroni3869531STMI
  Arroyo Guaitani3888574STMI(Arroyo Guaitani, Arroyo Huaitani, Estero Guaitani, Río Guaitani)(CL)
  Arroyo Colchane3894307STMI
  Rio CalajuallaRío Calajualla3897348STM
  Arroyo Tucuruma3868974STMI
  Estero Jornune3886842STM
  Estero Charvinto3895360STM
  Rio de OcacuchoRío de Ocacucho3878386STMI
  Estero Lupe Chico3881157STMI(Arroyo Lupe Chico, Río Lupe Chico, Estero Lupe Chico, Quebrada Lupe Chico)
  Rio ChancacoyaRío Chancacoya3895520STM
  Arroyo Lupe Grande3881155STMI(Arroyo Lupe Grande, Estero Lupe Grande, Quebrada Lupe Grande, Río Lupe Grande)
  Quebrada de Aroma3899323STMI(Arroyo Aroma, Estero Aroma, Quebrada de Aroma, Rio Aroma, Río Aroma)
  Rio PigaRío Piga3876043STMI
  Rio de CollacaguaRío de Collacagua3894226STMI(Rio de Collacagua, Rio de Collacugua, Río de Collacagua)

See also
 List of lakes in Chile
 List of volcanoes in Chile
 List of islands of Chile
 List of fjords, channels, sounds and straits of Chile
 List of lighthouses in Chile

Notes

References

External links
 Rivers of Chile
 Base de Datos Hidrográfica de Chile
 

Tarapaca